St. Stephen Church and Rectory is a registered historic building in Hamilton, Ohio, listed in the National Register on 1982-07-29.  Located in Hamilton's German Village Historic District, the church building is home to Saint Julie Billiart Catholic Parish, an active parish in the Roman Catholic Archdiocese of Cincinnati.

History

German settlers founded Saint Stephen Parish in 1830, making it the oldest Catholic parish in Butler County.  The original Gothic church building was begun in 1832, but the continued influx of German immigrants over the following decades required more space.  The new structure was completed in 1854 under the leadership of Fr.Piman Eberhard, OFM.  The church rectory was constructed in 1870.  The church sanctuary was expanded and the transepts were added in 1893, giving the church its current cruciform footprint.  The Tudor Gothic façade and tower were constructed by Andrew Benzing of Hamilton in 1912.  That same year, the church installed Munich-style stained glass windows from Zettler Studios of Munich, Germany.  In 1989, the Saint Stephen Church building became the home for Saint Julie Billiart Catholic Parish.  The new parish combined the congregations of two other local churches (Saint Mary and Saint Veronica churches) with the Saint Stephen congregation.

Notes

External links
 Parish website
 Video tour of the stained glass windows in the church on YouTube.

Churches on the National Register of Historic Places in Ohio
Churches in Butler County, Ohio
National Register of Historic Places in Butler County, Ohio
Buildings and structures in Hamilton, Ohio
Churches in the Roman Catholic Archdiocese of Cincinnati
Historic district contributing properties in Ohio